Johan (Jukka) Aleksander Lankila (5 April 1881 - 15 April 1919) was a Finnish journalist and politician, born in Raahe. He was a member of the Parliament of Finland from 1917 to 1918, representing the Social Democratic Party of Finland (SDP). He was imprisoned from 1918 to 1919 for having sided with the Reds during the Finnish Civil War. He died in detention from Influenza in Helsinki.

References

1881 births
1919 deaths
Deaths from Spanish flu
People from Raahe
People from Oulu Province (Grand Duchy of Finland)
Social Democratic Party of Finland politicians
Members of the Parliament of Finland (1917–19)
People of the Finnish Civil War (Red side)
Prisoners who died in Finnish detention
20th-century Finnish journalists